Kitab al-Athar, is one of the earlier Hadith books compiled by Imam Muhammad al-Shaybani (132 AH – 189 AH), the student of Imam Abu Hanifa. This book is sometime referred to Imam Abu Hanifa.

Description
The book contains almost 1,000 hadiths according to Maktaba Shamila. It is one of the oldest Hadith book written. The book contains many Hadiths that connect directly to the Islamic prophet Muhammad while others are the narrations of Sahabas (companions of Muhammad). Some of its Hadiths also attributed to students of Sahabas.

Publications
The book has been published by many organizations around the world: 
  Al-Athar of Imam Abu Hanifah: Published: Turath Publishing (25 November 2006)

See also
 List of Sunni books
 Kutub al-Sittah
 Sahih Muslim
 Jami al-Tirmidhi
 Sunan Abu Dawood
 Jami' at-Tirmidhi
 Either: Sunan ibn Majah, Muwatta Malik

References

9th-century Arabic books
10th-century Arabic books
Sunni literature
Hadith collections
Sunni hadith collections